Sal N. DiDomenico is an American state legislator who has served in the Massachusetts Senate since May 2010 and as Assistant Majority Leader since 2018. He is a Democrat representing the Middlesex and Suffolk district, which includes his hometown of Everett as well as Chelsea, Allston, Brighton, Charlestown, and parts of Cambridge and Boston. In 2010, he won a special election to succeed the retiring Anthony D. Galluccio. Before that, he spent three years as Gallucio's chief of staff. From 2004 to 2010 he was a member of the Everett City Council.

He resides in Everett, MA with his wife Tricia and two sons.

Early life and education 
DiDomenico was born on June 20, 1971 in Cambridge, Massachusetts. He attended Cambridge Rindge and Latin School before continuing his education at Boston College, where he earned a bachelor's degree in Business Administration in 1997.

Political career

Everett City Council 
Before DiDomenico was elected to the Everett City Council, he worked for twelve years in the hospitality industry, having worked at Sonesta International Hotels and Marriot International. DiDomenico was first elected to the Everett City Council in 2004. He was ultimately elected to serve four terms in the council, and was briefly President of the Everett City Council. In 2010 DiDomenico left the position to run for Massachusetts State Senate after the sudden resignation of Anthony Galluccio.

Massachusetts Senate 
In May 2010 DiDomenico won the special election to succeed Galluccio and complete his term before the seat was up for election again in November of that same year. At that time, the district was known as the Middlesex, Suffolk and Essex District. On September 14, 2010, DiDomenico won the Democratic primary against Timothy Flaherty by just under two hundred votes. DiDomenico was one of four incumbents who faced primary challengers that year. In the general election, DiDomenico beat Republican Barbara Bush, receiving nearly thirty thousand votes. DiDomenico said after his victory, "The people have spoken powerfully. I won't let them down." DiDomenico has held the seat ever since, mostly recently running unopposed in the 2018 election.

Committees 
In the 191st General Court, DiDomenico is on the following committees:

 Chairman of the Committee on Bills in the Third Reading 
 Vice Chairman of the Committee on Intergovernmental Affairs 
 Joint Committee on Education 
 Joint Committee on Labor and Workforce Development 
 Senate Committee on Steering and Policy

In the past, he has also served on the Senate Committees on Ways and Means and Redistricting, as well as the Joint Committees on Ways and Means, Community Development and Small Business, Consumer Protection and Professional Licensure, Financial Services, and Labor and Workforce Development.

Electoral history 

|-
| colspan=10 style="text-align:center;" |Massachusetts Senate, Middlesex and Suffolk District (General Election)
|-
! Year
! Democrat
! Votes
! Opponent
! Votes
|-
| style="text-align: left;" | 2010 (Special Election)
| style="background:#ccf;"| Sal DiDomenico (D)
| style="background:#ccf;"| 3,802
| style="background:#fff;"| John Cesan (I)
| style="background:#fff;"| 515
|-
|-
| style="text-align: left;" | 2010
| style="background:#ccf;"| Sal DiDomenico (D)
| style="background:#ccf;"| 29,472
| style="background:#fcc;"| Barbara Bush (R)
| style="background:#fcc;"| 8,494
|-
|-
| style="text-align: left;" | 2012
| style="background:#ccf;"| Sal DiDomenico (D)
| style="background:#ccf;"| 47,586
| style="background:#fff;"| None
| style="background:#fff;"| N/A
|-
|-
| style="text-align: left;" | 2014
| style="background:#ccf;"| Sal DiDomenico (D)
| style="background:#ccf;"| 31,575
| style="background:#fff;"| None
| style="background:#fff;"| N/A
|-
|-
| style="text-align: left;" | 2016
| style="background:#ccf;"| Sal DiDomenico (D)
| style="background:#ccf;"| N/A
| style="background:#fff;"| None
| style="background:#fff;"| N/A
|-
|-
| style="text-align: left;" | 2018
| style="background:#ccf;"| Sal DiDomenico (D)
| style="background:#ccf;"| 46,144
| style="background:#fff;"| None
| style="background:#fff;"| N/A
|-
From 2012 to 2018, DiDomenico ran unopposed. In 2010, DiDomenico's district was known as the Middlesex, Suffolk, and Essex District. It is now known as the Middlesex and Suffolk District.

Issues 
DiDomenico has filed many major pieces of legislation focusing on community development, education, children's health, election laws, human services, and public safety. He has also been recognized by over thirty organizations for his advocacy in the Legislature and was one of only 22 legislators throughout the United States to be selected as a 2015 Early Learning Fellow by the National Conference of State Legislators.

See also
 2019–2020 Massachusetts legislature
 2021–2022 Massachusetts legislature

References

Democratic Party Massachusetts state senators
Massachusetts city council members
Politicians from Everett, Massachusetts
Living people
21st-century American politicians
1971 births